The 2022 United States Senate election in Vermont was held on November 8, 2022, to elect a member of the United States Senate to represent the State of Vermont. Incumbent Democratic Senator Patrick Leahy, who was first elected in 1974 and most recently re-elected in 2016 with 61.3% of the vote, announced on November 15, 2021, that he would not seek re-election. Leahy was the only Democratic senator who did not run for re-election in 2022. Democratic U.S. Representative Peter Welch won the open seat.

Primary elections were held on August 9, 2022, with Welch, the incumbent U.S. Representative for the state's at-large congressional district, winning the Democratic primary, while Republican U.S. Army veteran Gerald Malloy won the Republican primary. On election day, Welch defeated Malloy in a landslide, sweeping every county in the state and taking 67.3% of the vote to Malloy's 27.6%. As winning the Democratic nomination is seen as tantamount to election in Vermont, the race was called for Welch shortly after polls closed.

At 75 years old, Welch became the oldest person ever elected to a first term as a U.S. senator and only the second Democratic senator from Vermont, after Leahy. This was the first open U.S. Senate seat in Vermont since 2006.

Background
On November 15, 2021, incumbent Democratic Senator Patrick Leahy announced that he would not seek re-election to a ninth term. First elected in 1974, Leahy is the only Democrat to ever represent Vermont in the Senate.

Democratic primary
Following Leahy's announcement that he would retire, speculation arose as to which Democrats could run to succeed him; Newsweek cited two of the leading possible contenders for the nomination as Peter Welch, who had served as U.S. Representative for Vermont's at-large congressional district since 2006, and President pro tempore of the Vermont Senate Becca Balint. Also considering a run was state representative Tanya Vyhovsky. However, candidates were reluctant to enter the race due to speculation that Bernie Sanders, Vermont's popular junior senator, would endorse Welch for the open seat. It was widely considered that an endorsement from Sanders would essentially lock up the race for Welch. While both men were both considered to be associated with the left-wing of the Democratic Party, Welch was noted by The Intercept to be rather more moderate than Sanders was, especially when compared to Vyhovsky.

Welch announced his campaign for the seat on November 22, 2021, pledging in a campaign video to support Medicare for All and the Green New Deal; he was immediately endorsed by Sanders.

Candidates

Nominee
Peter Welch, U.S. Representative for

Eliminated in primary
Isaac Evans-Frantz, peace activist
Niki Thran, physician

Declined 
Becca Balint, President pro tempore of the Vermont Senate (running for U.S. House)
Sarah Copeland-Hanzas, state representative
T. J. Donovan, Vermont Attorney General
Molly Gray, Lieutenant Governor of Vermont (ran for U.S. House)
Christine Hallquist, businesswoman and nominee for Governor of Vermont in 2018
Jill Krowinski, Speaker of the Vermont House of Representatives
Patrick Leahy, incumbent U.S. senator and president pro tempore
Kesha Ram Hinsdale, state senator and candidate for lieutenant governor in 2016 (endorsed Welch; running for re-election)
Tanya Vyhovsky, state representative (running for state senate)
David Zuckerman, former Lieutenant Governor of Vermont and Democratic and Progressive nominee for governor in 2020 (running for lieutenant governor)

Endorsements

Polling

Results

Republican primary

Candidates

Nominee
 Gerald Malloy, businessman and retired U.S. Army officer

Eliminated in primary
 Myers Mermel, commercial real estate banker
 Christina Nolan, former U.S. Attorney for the District of Vermont

Declined 
Jim Douglas, former Governor of Vermont and nominee for U.S. Senate in 1992
Phil Scott, Governor of Vermont (endorsed Nolan; running for re-election)

Endorsements

Polling

Results

Progressive primary

Candidates

Withdrew after winning primary 
Martha Abbott, former chair of the Vermont Progressive Party and candidate for governor in 2010, 2012, and 2014

Declined
Tanya Vyhovsky, state representative (running for state senate)

Results

Minor-parties and independents

Candidates

Declared
Mark Coester, truck driver
Natasha Diamondstone-Kohout (Green Mountain)
Stephen Duke
Dawn Marie Ellis
Cris Ericson, perennial candidate
Kerry Patrick Raheb, former stock broker

Declined 
Brock Pierce, cryptocurrency investor, former actor, and candidate for President of the United States in 2020
Christopher Helali (Party of Communists USA), farmer and teacher

General election

Predictions

Endorsements

Polling

Peter Welch vs. Christina Nolan

Patrick Leahy vs. Phil Scott

Debates

Results

See also 
 2022 United States Senate elections

Notes

References

External links
Campaign sites
 Gerald Malloy (R) for Senate
 Brock Pierce (I) for Senate
 Kerry Raheb (I) for Senate
 Peter Welch (D) for Senate

2022
Vermont
United States Senate